Sarıveliler is a town and district of Karaman Province in the Central Anatolia region of Turkey. According to 2000 census, population of the district is 21,308 of which 6,718 live in the town of Sarıveliler.

History
There is no exact information about town's history, we may assume people settled down the town at Roman Empire times.  Also by the archeological founds near Goktepe and Ugurlu, we understand people started to live in Sariveliler in 2000 B.C.

Notes

References

External links
 District governor's official website 
 District municipality's official website 

Populated places in Karaman Province
Districts of Karaman Province